An Age of Kings is a fifteen-part serial adaptation of the eight sequential history plays of William Shakespeare (Richard II, 1 Henry IV, 2 Henry IV, Henry V, 1 Henry VI, 2 Henry VI, 3 Henry VI and Richard III), produced and broadcast in Britain by the BBC in 1960. The United States broadcast of the series the following year was hosted by University of Southern California professor Frank Baxter, who provided an introduction for each episode specifically tailored for the American audience. At the time, the show was the most ambitious Shakespearean television adaptation ever made, and was a critical and commercial success in both the UK and the US.

Performed live, all episodes were telerecorded during their original broadcasts and, for their success and cultural significance, have survived intact.

Introduction
The concept for the series originated in 1959 with Peter Dews, a veteran BBC producer and director, who was inspired by a 1951 Anthony Quayle directed production of the Henriad at the Theatre Royal and a 1953 Douglas Seale directed repertory cast production of the three parts of Henry VI at the Birmingham Repertory Theatre and subsequently, The Old Vic. At the time, An Age of Kings was the most conceptually ambitious Shakespeare project ever undertaken, containing over 600 speaking roles, and requiring thirty weeks of rehearsal prior to performance. Each episode cost roughly £4,000. Adapter Eric Crozier cut the text of the eight plays into sixty-, seventy-, seventy-five- and eighty-minute episodes, which each episode roughly corresponding to half of each play. The only exception to this was 1 Henry VI, which was reduced to a single hour-long episode.

Dews sourced most of his cast from The Old Vic, using many of the same actors who had appeared in Seale's production, although in different roles (Paul Daneman for example, played Henry VI for Seale, but played Richard III in Age of Kings). Dews also used actors with whom he had worked whilst directing undergraduate plays at Oxford University. He gave the job of directing to his assistant, Michael Hayes. The initial plan was for the series to be the inaugural production in the BBC's newly built BBC Television Centre in London, but when the studios opened, the series was not ready, and was instead broadcast from the Riverside Studios in Hammersmith. Peter Dews described the set as "a large permanent structure; platforms, steps, corridors, pillars, and gardens, which will house nearly all the plays' action and which will, despite its outward realism, be not very far from Shakespeare's "unworthy scaffold"." The entire production was shot with four cameras running at any given time. For battle scenes, a cyclorama was used as a backdrop, obscured with smoke. Almost the entire series was shot in medium and close ups. All fifteen episodes were broadcast live, though a "telerecording" of the series was made.

Many of the episodes ended with wordless pseudo-teasers for the following episode. For example, "The Deposing of the King" ends with a shot of Northumberland's dagger stabbed into Henry IV's paperwork, visually alluding to his later rebellion. "Signs of War" ends with a shot of a signpost reading "Agincourt", alluding to the upcoming battle in the following episode. "The Sun in Splendour" ends with George, Duke of Clarence almost falling into a vat of wine, only to be saved by his brother, Richard, who looks deviously at the camera and smiles, alluding to his subsequent murder. "The Dangerous Brother" ends with Richard watching the sleeping Princes in the Tower before smiling to himself and then blowing out a candle, again alluding to his planned murder. Head of BBC drama Michael Barry referred to these "teasers" by explaining that "a strengthened purpose is added to the narrative when it is wholly seen, and we are able to look forward to 'what happens next'."

The series was a great success, with an average viewing audience of three million in the UK. The Times hailed the production as "monumental; a landmark in the BBC's Shakespearian tradition." The series won the British Guild of Directors' award for "Excellence in Directing" and the Peabody Award in the US. It led to a follow-up, The Spread of the Eagle, consisting of Shakespeare's Roman plays which did not prove as successful.

United States airing
After a run on the New York City independent commercial station WNEW beginning on 10 January 1961, the series was acquired for the United States public television network National Educational Television (NET) by the National Educational Television and Radio Center (NETRC), with financial support from the Humble Oil and Refining Company (the show was the first nationally distributed non-commercial series to receive support from a commercial source). Costing $250,000, Humble Oil not only paid for the national rights, but also for all publicity. NETRC promoted the show based on its educational value rather than its entertainment value, referring to it as "an experience in historical and cultural understanding," and stating "insofar as we are able, cultural phenomena peculiar to the time and environment will be [...] explained, and significant themes will be explored wherever appropriate." Well-known Shakespeare authority and Emmy Award-winning TV personality Frank Baxter of the University of Southern California provided commentary on the "historical, geographical and genealogical backgrounds of the plays." First airing on 20 October 1961, on the 60 non-commercial TV stations then on the air, it proved a hit with both audiences and critics; the New York Herald Tribune called it "easily one of the most magnificent efforts of the TV season"; The New York Times wrote "whatever may be said of their ethics, those noblemen make for superb entertainment." As public television's first smash hit, the series led to many other successful British drama imports.

Other countries
The series was also shown in several other countries, typically to a positive response. For example, in Australia, it was broadcast on ABC from October 1961, and was met with positive reviews. In Canada the series started October 1963. In West Germany, it was shown on WDR in 1967–1968. In the Netherlands, it was shown on NCRV from January 1966, again meeting with good reviews.

The episodes

"The Hollow Crown"

 First transmitted: 28 April 1960
 Running time: 60 minutes
 Content: Richard II Acts 1, 2 and Act 3, Scenes 1 and 2 (up to Richard conceding defeat despite the protests of Carlisle, Scroop and Aumerle).

 David William as King Richard the Second
 Edgar Wreford as John of Gaunt
 Tom Fleming as Henry Bolingbroke
 Noel Johnson as Duke of Norfolk
 David Andrews as Sir John Bushy
 Terence Lodge as Sir William Bagot
 Jerome Willis as Sir Henry Green
 Julian Glover as Lord Marshal
 John Greenwood as Duke of Aumerle
 Geoffrey Bayldon as Duke of York
 Juliet Cooke as Queen
 George A. Cooper as Earl of Northumberland
 Alan Rowe as Lord Ross
 Gordon Gostelow as Lord Willoughby
 Brian Smith as Servant
 Sean Connery as Harry Percy
 John Ringham as Lord Berkeley
 Frank Windsor as Bishop of Carlisle
 Leon Shepperdson as Earl of Salisbury
 Patrick Garland as Sir Stephen Scroop

"The Deposing of a King"

 First transmitted: 12 May 1960
 Running time: 60 minutes
 Content: Richard II from Act 3, Scene 3 onwards (beginning with York chiding Northumberland for not referring to Richard as "King").

 Tom Fleming as Henry Bolingbroke
 George A. Cooper as Earl of Northumberland
 Geoffrey Bayldon as Duke of York
 Sean Connery as Harry Percy
 David William as King Richard the Second
 John Greenwood as Duke of Aumerle
 Juliet Cooke as Queen
 Maggie Barton as Lady
 Eileen Atkins as Lady
 Gordon Gostelow as A Gardener
 Terence Lodge as A Servant
 Frank Windsor as Bishop of Carlisle
 Michael Graham Cox as Abbot of Westminster
 Mary Law as Duchess of York
 Robert Lang as Sir Pierce of Exton
 Anthony Valentine as Servant
 Julian Glover as Groom 
 Michael Graham Cox as Keeper

"Rebellion from the North"
 First transmitted: 26 May 1960
 Running time: 80 minutes
 Content: 1 Henry IV Acts 1 and 2 (up to Prince Hal expressing his disdain for the war).

 Tom Fleming as King Henry the Fourth
 Julian Glover as Earl of Westmoreland
 Frank Windsor as Sir Walter Blunt
 Patrick Garland as John of Lancaster
 Robert Hardy as Henry, Prince of Wales
 Frank Pettingell as Sir John Falstaff
 Brian Smith as Poins
 Geoffrey Bayldon as Earl of Worcester
 George A. Cooper as Earl of Northumberland
 Sean Connery as Hotspur
 Jerome Willis as Carrier
 Michael Graham Cox as Carrier
 Kenneth Farrington as Gadshill
 Gordon Gostelow as Bardolph
 Terence Lodge as Peto
 Patricia Heneghan as Lady Percy
 Derek Ware as Servant
 Timothy Harley as Francis
 John Ringham as Vintner
 Angela Baddeley as Mistress Quickly
 Robert Lang as Sheriff

"The Road to Shrewsbury"
 First transmitted: 9 June 1960
 Running time: 70 minutes
 Content: 1 Henry IV from Act 3, Scene 1 onwards (beginning with the strategy meeting between Hotspur, Mortimer and Glendower).

 David Andrews as Edmund Mortimer
 Sean Connery as Hotspur
 William Squire as Owen Glendower
 Geoffrey Bayldon as Earl of Worcester
 Valerie Gearon as Lady Mortimer
 Patricia Heneghan as Lady Percy
 Tom Fleming as King Henry the Fourth
 Robert Hardy as Henry, Prince of Wales
 Frank Windsor as Sir Walter Blunt
 Frank Pettingell as Sir John Falstaff
 Gordon Gostelow as Bardolph
 Angela Baddeley as Mistress Quickly
 Andrew Faulds as Earl of Douglas
 Anthony Valentine as Messenger
 Alan Rowe as Sir Richard Vernon
 Julian Glover as Earl of Westmoreland
 John Murray-Scott as 2nd Messenger
 Edgar Wreford as Archbishop of York
 Kenneth Farrington as Sir Michael
 Patrick Garland as John of Lancaster

"The New Conspiracy"

 First transmitted: 23 June 1960
 Running time: 60 minutes
 Content: 2 Henry IV Acts 1 and 2 (up to Prince Hal being summoned to court).

 David Andrews as Lord Bardolph
 John Ringham as Porter
 George A. Cooper as Earl of Northumberland
 Terence Lodge as Travers
 Jerome Willis as Morton
 Frank Pettingell as Sir John Falstaff
 Dane Howell as Page
 Geoffrey Bayldon as Lord Chief Justice
 John Greenwood as Servant
 Edgar Wreford as Archbishop of York
 Noel Johnson as Thomas Mowbray
 Robert Lang as Lord Hastings
 Angela Baddeley as Mistress Quickly
 John Ringham as Fang
 Alan Rowe as Snare
 Jeremy Bisley as Gower
 Margaret Courtenay as Wife to Northumberland
 Patricia Heneghan as Lady Percy
 Robert Hardy as Henry, Prince of Wales
 Brian Smith as Poins
 Gordon Gostelow as Bardolph
 Timothy Harley as Drawer
 Michael Graham Cox as Drawer
 Hermione Baddeley as Doll Tearsheet
 George A. Cooper as Ancient Pistol
 Terence Lodge as Peto

"Uneasy Lies the Head"
 First transmitted: 7 July 1960
 Running time: 75 minutes
 Content: 2 Henry IV from Act 3, Scene 1 onwards (beginning with Henry IV recalling Richard II's prediction of civil war).

 Tom Fleming as King Henry the Fourth
 Kenneth Farrington as Earl of Warwick
 William Squire as Shallow
 John Warner as Silence
 Gordon Gostelow as Bardolph
 Dane Howell as Page
 Frank Pettingell as Sir John Falstaff
 Terence Lodge as Mouldy
 Leon Shepperdson as Shadow
 Terry Wale as Wart
 Brian Smith as Feeble
 Frank Windsor as Bullcalf
 Patrick Garland as Prince John of Lancaster
 Julian Glover as Earl of Westmoreland
 Edgar Wreford as Archbishop of York
 Noel Johnson as Thomas Mowbray
 Robert Lang as Lord Hastings
 John Ringham as Humphrey of Gloucester
 John Greenwood as Thomas of Clarence
 Alan Rowe as Harcourt
 Robert Hardy as Henry, Prince of Wales
 Geoffrey Bayldon as Lord Chief Justice
 Michael Graham Cox as Davy
 George A. Cooper as Ancient Pistol
 Derek Ware as Groom
 Anthony Valentine as Groom
 William Squire as Epilogue

"Signs of War"
 
 First transmitted: 21 July 1960
 Running time: 60 minutes
 Content: Henry V Acts 1, 2 and 3 (up to the French yearning for what they feel will be an easy victory at Agincourt).

 William Squire as Chorus
 Robert Hardy as King Henry the Fifth
 Noel Johnson as Duke of Exeter
 Julian Glover as Earl of Westmoreland
 Cyril Luckham as Archbishop of Canterbury
 Leon Shepperdson as Rambures
 Frank Windsor as Earl of Cambridge
 Brian Smith as Lord Scroop
 Tony Garnett as Sir Thomas Grey
 Anthony Valentine as English Herald
 Gordon Gostelow as Bardolph
 David Andrews as Nym
 George A. Cooper as Pistol
 Angela Baddeley as Mistress Quickly
 Timothy Harley as Boy
 Patrick Garland as Duke of Bedford
 John Ringham as Duke of Gloucester
 Alan Rowe as King of France
 John Warner as The Dauphin
 George Selway as Constable of France
 Terence Lodge as Messenger
 Jerome Willis as Duke of Orléans
 Adrian Brine as Duke of Bourbon
 Stephanie Bidmead as Queen of France
 Judi Dench as Katherine
 Yvonne Coulette as Alice
 Kenneth Farrington as Fluellen
 Jeremy Bisley as Gower
 Joby Blanshard as Jamy
 Michael Graham Cox as Macmorris
 Robert Lang as Montjoy

"The Band of Brothers"
 First transmitted: 4 August 1960
 Running time: 60 minutes
 Content: Henry V from Act 4, Scene 0 onwards (beginning with the Chorus describing Henry's undercover surveillance of his camp).

 William Squire as Chorus
 Robert Hardy as King Henry the Fifth
 John Ringham as Duke of Gloucester
 Patrick Garland as Duke of Bedford
 Gordon Gostelow as Sir Thomas Erpingham
 George A. Cooper as Pistol
 Jeremy Bisley as Gower
 Kenneth Farrington as Fluellen
 Terry Wale as Court
 Tony Garnett as Bates
 Frank Windsor as Williams
 Joby Blanshard as Jamy
 Michael Graham Cox as Macmorris
 Jerome Willis as Duke of Orléans
 John Warner as The Dauphin
 George Selway as Constable of France
 Leon Shepperdson as Rambures
 Terence Lodge as Le Fer
 Adrian Brine as Duke of Bourbon
 Julian Glover as Earl of Westmoreland
 Noel Johnson as Duke of Exeter
 David Andrews as Earl of Salisbury
 Robert Lang as Montjoy
 John Greenwood as Duke of York
 Timothy Harley as Boy
 Anthony Valentine as English Herald
 Alan Rowe as King of France
 Stephanie Bidmead as Queen of France
 Edgar Wreford as Duke of Burgundy
 Judi Dench as Katherine
 Yvonne Coulette as Alice

"The Red Rose and the White"
 First transmitted: 25 August 1960
 Running time: 60 minutes
 Content: a heavily condensed version of 1 Henry VI.
 Alterations: as this is the only episode in the series which adapts an entire play, truncation is much more liberal here than elsewhere. The most obvious difference is the complete removal of Talbot, the ostensible protagonist of the play. The characters of Burgundy and Edmund Mortimer have also been removed, and dialogue is heavily cut from every scene. All of the battle scenes from France have also been removed and the episode concentrates almost entirely on the political disintegration in England.

 Patrick Garland as Duke of Bedford
 John Ringham as Duke of Gloucester
 Noel Johnson as Duke of Exeter
 Robert Lang as Cardinal of Winchester
 John Greenwood as Messenger
 Terry Wale as Messenger
 John Murray-Scott as Messenger
 Jerome Willis as The Dauphin
 Anthony Valentine as Duke of Alanson
 John Warner as Regnier
 David Andrews as Bastard of Orléans
 Eileen Atkins as Joan la Pucelle
 Julian Glover as Warder
 Jeremy Bisley as Warder
 Timothy Harley as Servingman
 Derek Ware as Servingman
 Kenneth Farrington as Servingman
 Leon Shepperdson as Woodvile
 Michael Graham Cox as Lord Mayor
 Jack May as Duke of York
 Edgar Wreford as Earl of Suffolk
 Alan Rowe as Duke of Somerset
 Frank Windsor as Earl of Warwick
 Tony Garnett as Vernon
 John Greenwood as Lawyer
 Terry Scully as King Henry the Sixth
 Mary Morris as Margaret
 Michael Graham Cox as Shepherd
 Barbara Grimes as Dancer

"The Fall of a Protector"
 
 First transmitted: 8 September 1960
 Running time: 60 minutes
 Content: 2 Henry VI Acts 1, 2 and Act 3, Scene 1 (up to York's soliloquy regarding the fact that he now has troops at his disposal and his revelation of his plans to use Jack Cade to instigate a popular rebellion).
 Alterations: Peter Thump does not kill Thomas Horner during the combat; he compels him to confess by sitting on him, and Horner is promptly arrested. 

 Edgar Wreford as Duke of Suffolk
 Terry Scully as King Henry the Sixth
 Mary Morris as Margaret
 John Ringham as Duke of Gloucester
 Robert Lang as Cardinal Beaufort
 Gordon Gostelow as Earl of Salisbury
 Frank Windsor as Earl of Warwick
 Jack May as Duke of York
 Kenneth Farrington as Duke of Buckingham
 Alan Rowe as Duke of Somerset
 Nancie Jackson as Duchess of Gloucester
 John Greenwood as Messenger
 Patrick Garland as John Hume
 David Andrews as Petitioner
 Anthony Valentine as Petitioner
 Derek Ware as Peter
 Julian Glover as An Armourer
 Terence Lodge as Bolingbroke
 Jeremy Bisley as Southwell
 Nan Marriott-Watson as Mother Jordan
 John Murray-Scott as A Spirit
 Timothy Harley as A Citizen
 John Warner as Simpcox
 Audrey Noble as Wife to Simpcox
 Jerome Willis as Mayor
 Leon Shepperdson as Beadle
 Tony Garnett as Neighbour
 Anthony Valentine as Neighbour
 Terry Wale as Neighbour
 Timothy Harley as Prentice
 John Greenwood as Prentice
 Jeffry Wickham as Sheriff 
 Jerome Willis as Sir John Stanley
 Tony Garnett as A Post

"The Rabble from Kent"

 First transmitted: 22 September 1960
 Running time: 60 minutes
 Content: 2 Henry VI from Act 3, Scene 2 onwards (beginning with the murder of the Duke of Gloucester).
 Alterations: the murder of Gloucester is shown, whereas in the text, it happens off-stage. The characters of both George Plantagenet and Edmund Plantagenet are introduced just prior to the First Battle of St Albans, whereas in the text, neither character is introduced until 3 Henry VI (Edmund in Act 1, Scene 3; George in Act 2, Scene 2). Additionally, Edmund is played by an adult actor, whereas in the text, he is a child. Buckingham is killed on screen. In the text, his fate remains unknown until the opening lines of 3 Henry VI, where it is revealed he was killed by Edward.

 John Ringham as Duke of Gloucester
 Terence Lodge as Murderer
 Adrian Brine as Murderer
 Patrick Garland as Murderer
 Edgar Wreford as Duke of Suffolk
 Terry Scully as King Henry the Sixth
 Mary Morris as Queen Margaret
 Robert Lang as Cardinal Beaufort
 Alan Rowe as Duke of Somerset
 Frank Windsor as Earl of Warwick
 Gordon Gostelow as Earl of Salisbury
 John Murray-Scott as Vaux
 David Andrews as A Sea-Captain
 John Ringham as Master
 Derek Ware as Master's Mate
 John Greenwood as Gentleman
 Jeremy Bisley as Gentleman
 Adrian Brine as Walter Whitmore
 Timothy Harley as George Bevis
 Tony Garnett as John Holland
 Esmond Knight as Jack Cade
 Anthony Valentine as Dick the Butcher
 Terence Lodge as Smith the Weaver
 Terry Wale as The Clerk
 Barry Jackson as Michael
 Leon Shepperdson as Sir Humphrey Stafford
 John Murray-Scott as Brother to Stafford
 Kenneth Farrington as Duke of Buckingham
 John Warner as Lord Say
 John Greenwood as Messenger
 Jeremy Bisley as Messenger
 Derek Ware as Soldier
 John Barcroft as Lord Clifford
 Jerome Willis as Young Clifford
 Jeffry Wickham as Alexander Iden
 Jack May as Duke of York
 Julian Glover as Edward
 Patrick Garland as George
 Paul Daneman as Richard
 Terry Wale as Edmund

"The Morning's War"
 First transmitted: 6 October 1960
 Running time: 60 minutes
 Content: 3 Henry VI Acts 1, 2 and Act 3, Scenes 1 and 2 (up to Richard's soliloquy wherein he vows to attain the crown).
 Alterations: the character of Edmund, Earl of Rutland is played by an adult actor, whereas in the text, he is a child. Additionally, Margaret is present during his murder, and we see her wipe his blood on the handkerchief which she later gives to York; in the text, Margaret does not witness the murder. During the Battle of Towton, Richard fights and kills Clifford, whereas in the text, they fight, but Clifford flees and is mortally wounded off-stage when hit by an arrow.

 Frank Windsor as Earl of Warwick
 Jack May as Duke of York
 Julian Glover as Edward IV
 Patrick Garland as George, Duke of Clarence
 Paul Daneman as Richard, Duke of Gloucester
 Adrian Brine as Marquess of Montague
 Jeffry Wickham as Duke of Norfolk
 Terry Scully as King Henry the Sixth
 Kenneth Farrington as Earl of Northumberland
 Jerome Willis as Lord Clifford
 Leon Shepperdson as Earl of Westmoreland
 Terence Lodge as Duke of Exeter
 Mary Morris as Queen Margaret
 John Greenwood as Prince of Wales
 Derek Ware as Gabriel
 Anthony Valentine as Sir John Mortimer
 Terry Wale as Rutland
 John Murray-Scott as Messenger
 Tony Garnett as Messenger
 David Andrews as A Son
 John Ringham as A Father
 Timothy Harley as Sinklo
 John Warner as Humphrey
 Jane Wenham as Lady Elizabeth Grey
 Jeremy Bisley as Nobleman

"The Sun in Splendour"
 First transmitted: 20 October 1960
 Running time: 60 minutes
 Content: 3 Henry VI from Act 3, Scene 3 onwards (beginning with Margaret's visit to Louis XI of France).
 Alterations: Edward is rescued from his imprisonment by Richard and Lord Stafford, whereas in the play, he is rescued by Richard, Lord Hastings and Lord Stanley. Warwick is killed during the Battle of Barnet by George, whereas in the text, he is carried onto stage mortally wounded by Edward. Also, the end of the episode differs slightly from the end of the play. After Edward expresses his wish that all conflict has ceased, a large celebration ensues. As the credits roll, Richard and George stand to one side, and George almost slips into a barrel of wine, only to be saved by Richard. As George walks away, Richard muses silently to himself and then smiles deviously at the camera.

 John Warner as King Lewis XI
 Tamara Hinchco as Lady Bona
 Mary Morris as Queen Margaret
 John Greenwood as Edward, Prince of Wales
 Robert Lang as Earl of Oxford
 Frank Windsor as Earl of Warwick
 Anthony Valentine as Post
 Paul Daneman as Richard, Duke of Gloucester
 Patrick Garland as George, Duke of Clarence
 Alan Rowe as Duke of Somerset
 Julian Glover as King Edward the Fourth
 Jane Wenham as Queen Elizabeth
 John Ringham as Watchman
 Timothy Harley as Watchman
 Kenneth Farrington as Lord Rivers
 David Andrews as Lord Hastings
 Edgar Wreford as Lord Stafford
 Derek Ware as Huntsman
 Terry Scully as King Henry the Sixth
 Gareth Tandy as Henry Tudor, Earl of Richmond
 John Murray-Scott as Messenger to King Henry
 Jeffry Wickham as Mayor of York
 Jerome Willis as Sir John Montgomery
 Terry Wale as Soldier
 Terence Lodge as Duke of Exeter
 Timothy Harley as Messenger to Warwick
 Jeremy Bisley as Messenger to Warwick
 Tony Garnett as Sir John Somerville
 Adrian Brine as Marquess of Montague
 Leon Shepperdson as Messenger to Queen Margaret

"The Dangerous Brother"
 First transmitted: 3 November 1960
 Running time: 60 minutes
 Content: Richard III Acts 1, 2 and Act 3, Scene 1 (up to Richard promising Buckingham the Dukedom of Hereford).
 Alterations: the character of Lord Grey is not portrayed as Queen Elizabeth's son, but simply as a kinsman; only Dorset is her son. In the text, although there is some confusion and overlapping regarding the two characters in the early scenes, in the latter half of the play, they are both depicted as her sons. As the closing credits roll, there is a scene of Richard watching the Princes sleeping; there is no such scene in the text. 

 Paul Daneman as Richard, Duke of Gloucester
 Patrick Garland as George, Duke of Clarence
 Frank Windsor as Brackenbury
 David Andrews as Lord Hastings
 Jill Dixon as Lady Anne
 John Greenwood as A Gentleman
 Terry Scully as King Henry VI
 Kenneth Farrington as Earl Rivers
 Leon Shepperdson as Lord Grey
 Jane Wenham as Queen Elizabeth
 Edgar Wreford as Duke of Buckingham
 Jack May as Lord Stanley
 Mary Morris as Queen Margaret
 John Ringham as Catesby
 Robert Lang as Murderer
 Terry Wale as Murderer
 Julian Glover as King Edward IV
 Anthony Valentine as Marquess of Dorset
 Alan Rowe as Ratcliff
 Violet Carson as Duchess of York
 Jeffry Wickham as Archbishop of York
 Michael Lewis as Richard, Duke of York
 Terence Lodge as Messenger
 Hugh Janes as King Edward V
 John Sharp as Lord Mayor
 Jerome Willis as Cardinal Bourchier

"The Boar Hunt"

 First transmitted: 17 November 1960
 Running time: 75 minutes
 Content: Richard III from Act 3, Scene 1 onwards (beginning with Stanley's messenger arriving at Hastings' house).
 Alterations: the scrivener's lamentation regarding the illegality of Hasting's execution is presented in the form of a plea as he attempts to convince two citizens to join him and speak out against Richard's actions; in the text, his speech is delivered as a soliloquy. The two priests between whom Richard stands as the Lord Mayor urges him to become King are not real priests, but two servants dressed up as priests. As Richard ascends to the throne for the first time, he stumbles, and has Buckingham help him into the chair; there is no such scene in the play. As in most filmed versions up this point (such as the 1912 The Life and Death of King Richard the Third and Laurence Olivier's 1955 Richard III), the ghosts appear only to Richard, whereas in the text they appear to both Richard and Richmond.

 John Greenwood as A Messenger
 David Andrews as Lord Hastings
 John Ringham as Sir William Catesby
 Jack May as Lord Stanley, Earl of Derby
 Jeremy Bisley as A Priest
 Edgar Wreford as Duke of Buckingham
 Alan Rowe as Sir Richard Ratcliff
 Kenneth Farrington as Earl Rivers
 Leon Shepperdson as Lord Grey
 Robert Lang as Sir Thomas Vaughan
 Frank Pettingell as Bishop of Ely
 Adrian Brine as Lord Lovell
 Paul Daneman as King Richard the Third
 John Sharp as Lord Mayor
 Terry Wale as Scrivener
 Violet Carson as Duchess of York
 Jill Dixon as Queen Anne
 Jane Wenham as Queen Elizabeth
 Anthony Valentine as Marquess of Dorset
 Frank Windsor as Sir Robert Brackenbury
 Timothy Harley as A Page
 Terence Lodge as Sir James Tyrell
 Timothy Harley as Messenger
 Derek Ware as Messenger
 John Murray-Scott as Messenger
 Terry Wale as Sir Christopher Urswick
 Jerome Willis as Henry Tudor, Earl of Richmond
 Julian Glover as Earl of Oxford
 Michael Wells as Sir Walter Herbert
 Jeffry Wickham as Sir James Blount
 Noel Johnson as Duke of Norfolk
 Barry Jackson as Earl of Surrey
 John Greenwood as Ghost of Prince Edward
 Terry Scully as Ghost of King Henry the Sixth
 Patrick Garland as Ghost of Clarence
 Hugh Janes as Ghost of King Edward the Fifth
 Michael Lewis as Ghost of Richard of York

See also
 The Spread of the Eagle (1963)
 The Wars of the Roses (1963; 1965)
 BBC Television Shakespeare (1978-1985)
 Shakespeare: The Animated Tales (1992-1994)
 ShakespeaRe-Told (2005)
 The Hollow Crown (2012; 2016)

References

External links
 An Age Of Kings - Series introduction and episode overviews Archive Television Musings
 British Universities Film and Video Council
 
 An Age of Kings at Screenonline
 "The Television Revolution"

1960 British television series debuts
1960 British television series endings
1960s British drama television series
BBC television dramas
Black-and-white British television shows
English-language television shows
Films based on Henry IV (play)
Films based on Henry V (play)
Films based on Henry VI (play)
Films based on Richard II (play)
Films based on Richard III (play)
Television shows based on plays
Television series set in the 14th century
Television series set in the 15th century